Mersch is a commune in Luxembourg.

Mersch may also refer to:

Places
 Mersch (canton), a canton of Luxembourg centered on Mersch
 Mersch District, a former district of Luxembourg centered on Mersch

People
 Arsène Mersch (1913–1980), a Luxembourgian cyclist
 Jean Mersch-Wittenauer (1819–1879), a Luxembourgian politician and Mayor of Luxembourg City
 Jules Mersch (1898–1973), a Luxembourgian publisher and writer
 Michael J. Mersch (1868–1954), an American politician
 Yves Mersch (born 1949), a Luxembourgian economist and board member of the European Central Bank